Faro may refer to:

Places

Africa
 Faro (department), North Province, Cameroon
 Faro National Park, Cameroon

Americas
 Faro, Pará, Brazil, a municipality
 Faro, Yukon, Canada, a town
 Faro (electoral district)
 Faro Airport (Yukon)
 Faro/Johnson Lake Water Aerodrome
 Faro, Missouri, an unincorporated community, USA
 Faro, North Carolina, an unincorporated community, USA

Europe
 Faro District, the southern district covering the Algarve in southern Portugal
 Faro, Portugal, the municipality and main city of the district
 Faro Airport, the main regional airport in the district
 Roman Catholic Diocese of Faro, serving the district
 Farø, an island in Denmark
 Fårö, a Swedish island in the Baltic Sea
 Faro Point, the northeastern point of Sicily, Italy

Extraterrestrial
 9358 Fårö, a main belt asteroid

People
 Saint Faro, Roman Catholic Bishop of Meaux, France
 Faro (surname)
 Faro, pen name of editors Faith and A. Ross Eckler Jr. (1927–2016)

FARO
 Fábrica de Artes y Oficios Oriente, a cultural center and training facility in Mexico City
 Grupo FARO (Foundation for the Advance of Reforms and Opportunities), a think tank in Ecuador

Other uses
 Faro (card game), a card game
 Faro (beer), a type of Belgian ale
 Count of Faro, a Portuguese title
 Faro (mythology), a god in Mande mythology
 the title character of Buddy Faro, a 1998 television series, portrayed by Dennis Farina
 Faro, a large cotton sphere burned inside churches on feasts of martyrs in the Ambrosian Rite

See also
 El Faro (disambiguation)
 Odmar Færø (born 1989), Faroese footballer
 Faroe Islands
 Faroe (disambiguation)
 Faros (disambiguation)
 Farro, a wheat plant also known as Emmer
 Ferro (disambiguation)
 Pharao, a German Eurodance band
 Pharaoh (disambiguation)
 Pharo, programming language
 Pharos (disambiguation)